Islampur College, established in 1973, is the general degree college in Islampur, in the Uttar Dinajpur district. It offers Graduate courses in Arts, Commerce and Science. It is affiliated to University of North Bengal.

Governing body
 SHRI KANAIALAL AGARWAL	President
 Prof. KAJAL RANJAN BISWAS 	Secretary
 SHRI SATYEN KUMAR DAS	Govt. Nominee
 MD. ZAKIR HUSSAIN	Govt. Nominee
 DR. TAPAS ADHIKARY	Teacher Representative
 DR. ANURADHA SINHA	Teacher Representative
 DR. DILIP PAUL	Teacher Representative
 MD. MUZAHERUL HAQUE	Non-Teaching Representative

Departments
Bengali
Chemistry
Commerce
Economics
English
Geography
Hindi
History
Philosophy
Physics
Mathematics (Honours)
Political Science(Honours)
اردو (Urdu)

Accreditation
The college is recognized by the University Grants Commission (UGC).

See also

References

External links
www.islampurcollege.org
University of North Bengal
University Grants Commission
National Assessment and Accreditation Council

Colleges affiliated to University of North Bengal
Educational institutions established in 1973
Universities and colleges in Uttar Dinajpur district
1973 establishments in West Bengal